North Stonewall Terrace is a residential neighborhood in eastern Dallas, Texas (US). It is adjacent to several East Dallas neighborhoods, including Caruth Terrace, Stonewall Terrace, and University Crossing.

North Stonewall Terrace is bound by Skillman Street to the east, the Dallas Area Rapid Transit (DART) light rail Blue Line to the north, the Matilda Bridge to the west and East Mockingbird Lane to the south.

The original name of this area is Montebello Park.  The "Stonewall Terrace" terminology dates from approximately the early 2000s.

Government 

At the national level, North Stonewall Terrace is represented by John Cornyn (R) and Ted Cruz (R) in the US Senate. In the US House of Representatives, the neighborhood resides in US Congressional District 32, which is represented by Colin Allred (D).

At the state level, Nathan M. Johnson (D) represents North Stonewall Terrace and District 16  in the Texas State Senate. The neighborhood sits in District 108  of the Texas House of Representatives, which is represented by Morgan Meyer (R).

At the city level, Mike Rawlings (D) is the mayor of Dallas and Philip T. Kingston represents North Stonewall Terrace in Dallas City Council District 14.

Municipal Services 

The City of Dallas provides municipal services to North Stonewall Terrace such as sanitation (both sewer and refuse), water, and street maintenance.

The Dallas Police Department (DPD) provides law enforcement service to North Stonewall Terrace. The neighborhood is patrolled by DPD's Northeast Patrol Division, which is located at 9915 E. Northwest Highway. The Northeast Patrol is divided into five geographical areas called sectors. Each  sector  is  then  divided  into  smaller areas  called  beats and are patrolled  by  beat  officers.  Each  beat  then  contains  neighborhoods 
which are referred to as reporting areas. North Stonewall Terrace is part of Sector 210, Beat 219, Reporting Area 1117, respectively.

The Dallas Fire-Rescue Department provides fire protection and emergency medical services to North Stonewall Terrace.

Education

Primary and secondary schools

Public schools 
North Stonewall Terrace is served by the Dallas Independent School District (DISD). The neighborhood resides in DISD Board of Trustees District 2, and is represented by DISD Board of Trustees member Dustin Marshall. Students living in North Stonewall Terrace are assigned to the following public schools:

 Mockingbird Elementary School
 National Blue Ribbon School in 98-99 
 J.L. Long Middle School
 An International Baccalaureate World School offering the IB Middle Years Programme
 Woodrow Wilson High School
 An International Baccalaureate World School offering the IB Diploma Programme

Preschool programs
Mockingbird Early Childhood PTO serves the area.

Media
Advocate Magazine is the local monthly magazine that covers a variety of East Dallas topics and has served the community since 1991.

Residents of Note 
There have been quite a few residents of note that have lived in North Stonewall Terrace.  Currently Hamilton P. Bone III resides at the Polish T residence.

References

External links